Remittent fever is a type or pattern of fever in which temperature does not touch the baseline and remains above normal throughout the day. Daily variation in temperature is more than 1°C in 24 hours, which is also the main difference as compared to continuous fever. Fever due to most infectious diseases is remittent. Diagnosis is based upon clinical history, blood tests, blood culture and chest X-ray.

Examples 
Examples of remittent fever are as following.
 Infective endocarditis
 Typhoid
 Brucellosis

Management 
Management is carried out using antipyretics for fever and body aches. Antibiotics are used in case of infectious diseases and for infective endocarditis, in addition to antibiotics, cardiac valve prosthesis and mitral valve replacement surgery is used.

See also 
 Continuous fever
 Intermittent fever
 Relapsing fever
 Undulant fever
 Neutropenic fever

References 

Fever